Joan Armatrading is the third studio album by British singer-songwriter Joan Armatrading, released in 1976 by A&M Records. It was her first album to be recorded entirely in London, as her first two albums – Whatever's for Us and Back to the Night being partially recorded in France and Wales respectively in addition to London.

Released in 1976, the album peaked at number 12 on the UK Albums Chart and was certified Gold by the British Phonographic Industry. It also included one of Armatrading's best-selling singles, "Love and Affection".

Armatrading's 1979 live album Steppin' Out contained two songs from this album, "Love and Affection" and "Tall in the Saddle". She is pictured on the cover of the album playing an Ovation Guitar.

The album's producer, Glyn Johns, later said it was the best album he had ever been associated with.

Reception

Reviewing for Sounds, Phil Sutcliffe gave the album 5 out of 5, describing it as a "continuation of Back To The Night, [...] maintaining the musical standards of lightness, flexibility and clarity and in several songs stepping into a new dimension of expressiveness with her lyrics." "Unrecognised as she is we need Joan Armatrading like we need Bob Dylan and the Beatles. You'll play this record once in a while forever."

David Hepworth for New Musical Express wrote that Armatrading "no longer has to prove anything to anybody for she defines her own terms; the poetry of this album is not the flat print of the lyric sheet but lies rather in the animate pulse of pure music where voice, words, tune and instruments are utterly inseparable." and that she "has quite possibly come up with the richest work of this renaissance [of putting the heart back into music] so far, and if there's another album as good as this in the remainder of the year we'll be very lucky indeed. Invest. Immediately." 

Reviewing for Melody Maker, Richard Williams wrote that her "writing, singing, and playing evince a sure-footedness which borders on arrogance" and "much of this must be due to the influence of her new producer, Glyn Johns, whose finest hour this is. Teaming her with musicians of spirit and taste, he uses textural effects (strings, added guitars, voices) with economy yet with unerring rightness: each added component strengthens the song without overcrowding the singer or the song." 

When reviewed in Billboard magazine, the album was described as "thoroughly diverse and immensely enjoyable", delivering "the kind of lyrically touching and introspective ballads that have characterized Janis Ian's work."

Writing at the time in The Guardian, Robin Denselow wrote that the album "showed that we now have a black artist in Britain with the same sort of vocal range, originality (in fact even greater originality in terms of musical influences) and lyrical sensitivity" as Joni Mitchell. 

In a retrospective review for AllMusic, Dave Connolly calls it Armatrading's "most muscular music to date" and particularly praises "Down to Zero" and "Love and Affection". He also commends Glyn Johns' production. He says that the album "almost single-handedly [elevated Armatrading] into the ranks of rock's leading female artists."

The album was included in Robert Dimery's edited book 1001 Albums You Must Hear Before You Die.

Track listing

Personnel
Musicians
Joan Armatrading – vocals, 6 & 12-string acoustic guitars
Jerry Donahue – acoustic & electric guitars
Bryn Haworth – slide guitar on "Like Fire", mandolin on "Somebody Who Loves You"
Jimmy Jewell – alto saxophone on "Love and Affection"
Dave Markee – bass guitar
B. J. Cole – steel guitar on "Down to Zero"
Graham Lyle – 12-string guitar on "Down to Zero"
Dave Mattacks – drums
Brian Rogers – string arrangement on "Help Yourself"
Peter Wood – Hammond organ, piano, electric piano
Kenney Jones – drums
Leroy Champaign – backing vocals on "Love and Affection" and "People"
Clarke Peters – backing vocals on "Love and Affection" and "People"

Technical
Fabio Nicoli – art direction
Nick Marshall – design
Clive Arrowsmith – photography

Charts

Weekly charts

Year-end charts

Certifications

References

Bibliography
 Futrell, Jon; Gill, Chris; St. Pierre, Roger; Richardson, Clive; Fisher, Bob; Sheehy, Bill and Wesker, Lindsay (1982) The Illustrated Encyclopedia of Black Music. Salamander Books, London. 

1976 albums
Joan Armatrading albums
A&M Records albums
Albums produced by Glyn Johns
Albums recorded at Olympic Sound Studios